Mike Barker (born 29 November 1965) is a British film director. His 2003 film To Kill a King was entered into the 25th Moscow International Film Festival.

Filmography 
The Sandman (2022)
Luckiest Girl Alive (2022)
Hit & Run (TV series) (2021)
The Handmaid's Tale TV series, seasons 1–5 (2017–22)
Fargo TV series, season 3 (2017)
Versailles TV series (2017)
The Tunnel TV series (2016)
Broadchurch TV series (2015)
Outlander TV series, seasons 1–2 (2014–16)
Rogue TV series (2014)
The Smoke TV series (2014)
Silent Witness TV series (2013)
Moby Dick TV miniseries (2011)
Sea Wolf TV miniseries (2009)
Butterfly on a Wheel (2007)
A Good Woman (2004)
To Kill a King (2003)
Lorna Doone TV mini series (2000)
Best Laid Plans (1999)
The James Gang (1997)
The Tenant of Wildfell Hall TV miniseries (1996)
Silent Witness TV series (1996)

References

External links 

Mike Barker at NYTimes.com

1965 births
Living people
British film directors